Ntu is a village in Nagaland, India.

NTU may stand for:
 National Taxpayers Union, a nonprofit organization in the United States
 National Team Unity, a political party in Trinidad and Tobago
 National Television Company of Ukraine, a Ukrainian television broadcaster
 Naval Air Station Oceana, a military airport in Virginia Beach, Virginia, U.S.
 Nephelometric Turbidity Unit, a measure of the cloudiness of a liquid
 Network Termination Unit, a networking device that connects the PSTN to CPE
 Nevada–Texas–Utah Retort, a shale oil extraction technology
 New Threat Upgrade, a US Navy anti-air warfare ships system upgrade
 NTU method uses the Number of Transfer Units to calculate the effectiveness of a heat exchanger

Education 
 Nantong University, a university in Nantong, Jiangsu, China
 Nanyang Technological University, an autonomous university in Singapore
 National Taiwan University, a university in Taiwan
 National Technological University, the National University of Technology in Argentina
 National Textile University, a university in the Islamic Republic of Pakistan
 North Texas University, Texas, United States
 Northern Territory University, Darwin, Australia
 Nottingham Trent University, a university in the United Kingdom